Lin Jinghao (born 6 February 2000) is a Chinese footballer currently playing as a midfielder for China League Two side Zhuhai Qin'ao.

Career statistics

Club

Notes

References

2000 births
Living people
Chinese footballers
Association football midfielders
Beijing Renhe F.C. players
China League One players
Chinese Super League players